New Wells is an unincorporated community in northern Cape Girardeau County, Missouri, United States.

Demographics

Etymology

The source of the original name Johannisberg remains something of a mystery. There are many German places by that name, but none of them is listed as the original home of any of the Saxon colony that came to Perry County. It is not likely to have been the well-known Johannisberg on the Rhine, which is a Catholic stronghold, nor is it likely to have been Johannisberg in East Prussia, which also would not have had any connection with the Saxons. There is a Johannisberg in the historically German-speaking part of Bohemia, near Reichenberg, about seventy miles southeast of Dresden across the Erzgebirge, and some connection is possible between it and Martin Stephan's earlier Bohemian days. But the most probable conjecture is that the name was coined from the name of Stephan's church in Dresden, the "Johannis-Gemeinde", or else that it is a lost parish name from somewhere near Dresden, which is particularly rich in Johannis-names. Austrian settlers referred to the community as Neu Wels, after the city in Austria, which was later Americanized to New Wells.

History 

Johannisberg was one of the seven colonies established in 1839 in the Saxon Migration to Perry County, Missouri. Johannisberg is said to have been an offshoot of the Dresden settlement. It is thought the split was caused by a quarrel over the sale of lots at Wittenberg to the general public. Members of the New York group violently opposed this move, which was proposed because of the failure of Wittenberg to grow as fast as had been hoped. They severed financial connections with the community, and withdrew into a separate settlement, although they continued other connections with the Saxons. Walther continued to serve both Dresden and Johannisberg until the end of 1841, but after his departure for St. Louis both were made branches of Altenburg. An account in the Western District Lutheran tells how in the late 1840s services were held on a hill near the town.

In 1852, fresh settlers arrived from Austria, and these for a while continued to attend church at Altenburg in Perry County. But because Apple Creek often rose and prevented attendance at the church in Altenburg, a separate church was organized in 1853 for Johannisberg.

Education
New Wells is in the Jackson R-2 School District, which operates Jackson High School.

References 

German-American culture in Missouri
Unincorporated communities in Cape Girardeau County, Missouri
Cape Girardeau–Jackson metropolitan area
Unincorporated communities in Missouri